Kulagin is a Russian masculine surname, its feminine counterpart is Kulagina. It may refer to:

Aleksandr Kulagin (born 1954), Russian rower 
Boris Kulagin (1924–1988), Russian ice hockey player
Dmitry Kulagin (born 1992), Russian basketball player
Leonid Kulagin (born 1940), Russian actor, film director and screenwriter
Nina Kulagina (1926–1990), Russian woman who claimed to have psychic powers
Valentina Kulagina (1902–1987), Russian painter and graphical designer

Russian-language surnames